Jesús Delfin Merchán (born March 26, 1981) is a Venezuelan former professional baseball shortstop and current hitting coach for the GCL Marlins.

Previously he played in the farm systems of the Minnesota Twins (2000–2005), Philadelphia Phillies (2005–2007), Seattle Mariners (2007), Arizona Diamondbacks (2008), Cleveland Indians (2009), Toronto Blue Jays (2010), Florida Marlins (2011), Colorado Rockies (2011) and San Diego Padres (2013). He also played in the Atlantic League of Professional Baseball for the Lancaster Barnstormers in 2012.

Merchán was named as the hitting coach for the Batavia Muckdogs of the Miami Marlins organization for the 2018 season.

Merchán was named as the hitting coach for the GCL Marlins of the Miami Marlins organization for the 2019 season.

Merchán played for the Spain national baseball team in the 2013 World Baseball Classic.

References

External links

1981 births
Living people
Akron Aeros players
Arizona League Indians players
Baseball infielders
Clearwater Threshers players
Columbus Clippers players
Colorado Springs Sky Sox players
Dunedin Blue Jays players
Elizabethton Twins players
Fort Myers Miracle players
Gulf Coast Twins players
Lakewood BlueClaws players
Lancaster Barnstormers players
Las Vegas 51s players
Minor league baseball coaches
Navegantes del Magallanes players
New Orleans Zephyrs players
Ottawa Lynx players
Quad Cities River Bandits players
Reading Phillies players
Southern Maryland Blue Crabs players
Sportspeople from Maracay
Tigres de Aragua players
Trois-Rivières Aigles players
Tucson Padres players
Tucson Sidewinders players
Venezuelan baseball coaches
Venezuelan expatriate baseball players in Canada
Venezuelan expatriate baseball players in the United States
West Tennessee Diamond Jaxx players
2013 World Baseball Classic players